Shang-Fen Ren is a professor emerita at Illinois State University.

She was appointed professor at Illinois in 1995, retiring to become professor emerita in 2011.

She was awarded the status of Fellow in the American Physical Society, after she was nominated by their Forum on International Physics in 2001, "for her contributions to theoretical understanding of low-dimensional semiconductor systems, especially the vibrational properties in semiconductor superlattices, quantum wires, and quantum dots as well as for her many contributions promoting international physics."

References 

Year of birth missing (living people)
Living people
American women physicists
Illinois State University faculty
Fellows of the American Physical Society
American Physical Society
American women academics
21st-century American women